Joseph W. Maher (born c. 1953), known as Big Joe Maher, is an American electric blues drummer, singer and songwriter. He is known for his jump blues group called Big Joe & the Dynaflows. He has worked with many blues musicians including Delbert McClinton, Anson Funderburgh, Kevin McKendree, Bob Margolin, Mark Wenner, Ann Rabson, Jimmy Witherspoon, Bull Moose Jackson, Nappy Brown, Otis Rush, Earl King, Duke Robillard, and Tom Principato.

Life and career
Joseph Maher was born and raised in Washington, D.C., and initially inspired by both his father's record collection and attending blues concerts in his hometown, Maher had learned to play the drums by his early teenage years.  After graduation Maher assembled a three piece blues/jazz ensemble, before touring as part of Tom Principato's backing band.  He later put together a five piece band known as Big Joe & the Dynaflows, who specialised in dance-oriented jump blues.

Big Joe & the Dynaflows debut album, Good Rockin' Daddy was released by Ichiban Records in 1990.  Then followed a string of releases on various record labels up to All Night Long (2000). These included, Mojo, a stripped down affair which featured Jeff Sarli on bass guitar. In December 1994, The Washington Post noted that "listening to the opening (and title) track for a few seconds is all it takes to confirm that this session's atmosphere and pacing has more to do with Percy Mayfield's laconic balladry, than Big Joe Turner's barroom barking". His 1998 release, I'm Still Swingin''', was given a Washington Area Music Award for Best Blues Recording. Maher has also performed with his own Big Three Trio and the Big Four Combo, which have included John Cocuzzi.

Maher later worked as the musical director in Alexandria, Virginia, in the Mick Fleetwood owned nightclub, Fleetwood's.  Several occasions followed where Fleetwood booked Big Joe and the Dynaflows as his back-up band at the club.  Maher has also worked extensively on other musician's recordings, including Bob Margolin's The Old School, Tom Principato's In Orbit (1991), Mark Wenner's Nothin' But, plus Ann Rabson's Music Makin' Mama (1997).

In 2005 and 2009, Maher was awarded the title of Male Blues Vocalist of the Year at the Washington Area Music Awards.

In 2000, his band was involved in the recording of I Warned You Baby, a compilation made for use by the Carolina shag scene.You Can't Keep a Big Man Down was released in 2011 on Severn Records. The title track related to the almost career ending back injury which Maher suffered in late 2001, and explained his long absence from recording. The album included a guest appearance from Dennis Taylor on saxophone.

In mid 2012, Maher jointly toured with Anson Funderburgh.

Big Joe & the Dynaflows' most recent release, Rockhouse Party'', was issued on February 15, 2019.

Discography

Albums

See also
 List of electric blues musicians

References

External links
Images and information at Pinterest.com
Discography

1964 births
Living people
21st-century American composers
American blues singer-songwriters
Electric blues musicians
American male singer-songwriters
American male drummers
20th-century American drummers
21st-century American drummers
20th-century American male musicians
21st-century American male musicians
Singer-songwriters from Washington, D.C.